The 1902–03 Welsh Amateur Cup was the thirteenth season of the Welsh Amateur Cup. The cup was won by Druids Reserves who defeated Bangor Reserves 4-0 in the final, at The Racecourse, Wrexham.

First round

Second round

Third round

Fourth round

Semi-final

Final

References

1902-03
Welsh Cup
1902–03 domestic association football cups